Hildy Kuryk (born September 30, 1977) is the Director of Communications for Vogue Magazine and the former National Finance Director of the Democratic National Committee as of 2014. In 2011, Kuryk was named one of Politico's "50 Politicos to Watch: Fundraisers".

Political career 

Kuryk began her career in the White House Office of Legislative Affairs during the Clinton Administration. She was then hired as a finance assistant to the Democratic Senatorial Campaign Committee. In 2004, Kuryk worked for former U.S. Senator Tom Daschle and on Dick Gephardt's presidential campaign. In 2006, Kuryk worked for Charlie King's New York Attorney General campaign. She then started her own business.

Throughout Barack Obama's first presidential campaign, Kuryk worked on an east coast fundraising strategy for the then-candidate. By June 2007, she was senior New York finance consultant for the campaign.

From 2009 to 2010 Kuryk served as deputy finance director at the Democratic National Committee, and was promoted to national finance director in April 2011 where she acted as a liaison between the organization and key donors and stakeholders. The same year, Kuryk was named one of Politico's "50 Politicos to Watch" for her work on the Obama campaign and at the Democratic National Committee. After leaving her post at the DNC in 2012, Kuryk continued to act as a consultant for the organization throughout the beginning of 2013.

She is also a co-chair on the advisory board of Organizing for Action.

Vogue 
In April 2013, Kuryk was hired as Vogue magazine's director of communications.

Personal life 

Kuryk was married to Jarrod Bernstein in June 2007 and currently resides in New York City.

References 

1977 births
Living people
21st-century American businesspeople
Vogue (magazine) people
Barack Obama 2008 presidential campaign
Vanderbilt University alumni